Gunnedah railway station is located on the Mungindi line in New South Wales, Australia. It serves the town of Gunnedah. It was added to the New South Wales State Heritage Register on 2 April 1999.

History

The station opened on 11 September 1879 when the line was extended from Breeza. It served as the terminus of the line until it was extended to Boggabri on 11 July 1882.

The original station building was replaced by the current structure in 1915. The station has one platform and a passing loop.

Services
Gunnedah is served by NSW TrainLink's daily Northern Tablelands Xplorer service operating between Moree and Sydney.

Description 

The station complex consists of a type 11 brick station building of an initial side platform design with unusual brackets to its awning, and an associated loading bank.

Heritage listing 

The station building is unique as it was built during a period where country stations were generally simple in design. This is a large structure with an unusually large cantilevered awning to the platform. It is a well-proportioned substantial brick building and although modest in detail, it is an imposing structure for its time. It is unusual in that it exhibits Edwardian elements such as the curved window heads and A/C shingle roof. The building adds to the historic fabric of the town presenting an elegant facade to the street while presenting an unusually large awning to the platform side. It is one of the few surviving substantial railway buildings in the north-west of the State.

Gunnedah railway station was listed on the New South Wales State Heritage Register on 2 April 1999 having satisfied the following criteria.

The place possesses uncommon, rare or endangered aspects of the cultural or natural history of New South Wales.

This item is assessed as historically rare. This item is assessed as arch. rare. This item is assessed as socially rare.

References

Attribution

External links
Gunedah station details Transport for New South Wales

Easy Access railway stations in New South Wales
North West Slopes
Railway stations in Australia opened in 1879
Regional railway stations in New South Wales
New South Wales State Heritage Register
Gunnedah, New South Wales